Christensenia aesculifolia is a species of tropical fern found throughout southeast Asia. Its leaves resemble horse chestnuts.

References

External links

Christensenia aesculifolia info

Marattiidae